Komalika Bari (born 5 February 2002 in Jamshedpur) is only the third Indian player to win the world title at the Tata Archery Academy's Cadet World Youth Archery Championships. She made her mark to ensure her place in the Indian team for elite events including the World Championships and the Olympic Test Event. She is an alumna of Shiksha Niketan school.
Had participated in world u-18 championship held in Wroclaw in the month of August.

References

External links
 

2002 births
Living people
Indian female archers
Sportswomen from Jharkhand
People from Jamshedpur
21st-century Indian women
21st-century Indian people
Archers from Jharkhand